Interpret Scotland is an inter-agency initiative between Scottish organisations concerned with heritage interpretation. It was begun in 1997 and its key aims are to :

 Improve the quality and quantity of interpretation in Scotland
 Promote the co-ordination of interpretation at local and strategic level
 Share resources, expertise and experience to avoid duplicating effort

The Interpret Scotland journal, which is published twice a year, has been running since 2000 and includes articles on all facets of interpretation. Interpret Scotland can be credited with raising awareness of professional heritage interpretation within Scotland, particularly through inter-agency support and networking.

Together with the Association for Heritage Interpretation, Interpret Scotland established a steering group which planned and carried out The Vital Spark Interpretation Conference.

List of members 

The Interpret Scotland steering group has expanded over the years and currently consists of :-

 Association for Scottish Visitor Attractions
 Council for Scottish Archaeology
 Forestry Commission Scotland
 Highlands and Islands Enterprise
 Historic Scotland
 Museums Galleries Scotland
 National Archives of Scotland
 National Galleries of Scotland
 National Museums of Scotland
 The National Trust for Scotland
 Royal Botanic Gardens Edinburgh
 Royal Society for the Protection of Birds
 Scottish Enterprise
 Scottish Natural Heritage
 Scottish Tourist Guides Association
 Scottish Wildlife Trust
 VisitScotland

References 

 Bob Jones, 'Interpret Scotland - a look back in awe!', Interpret Scotland Journal Issue 16, p10

External links 

 Interpret Scotland website
 Past Issues of Interpret Scotland Journal

1997 establishments in Scotland
Heritage organisations in Scotland
Scottish culture
Organizations established in 1997
Heritage interpretation organizations